Panjeri (Urdu: پنجیڑی) is a village in Bhimber District of Azad Kashmir, Pakistan. It is equidistant between Bhimber and Mirpur. It has a population of 18,000. The village is a Rajput stronghold, comprising most of the population. Large numbers are in the military. It has a Union Council of 39 sub-villages and is the most important Union Council of Bhimber District. Panjeri is known within AJK as "the land of war heroes".

History

The inhabitants are descended from Baba Shadi Shaheed, who was the first Chib Rajput. The village founder was Peer Taj Ud Din Bukhari (his shrine is the heart of Panjeri). The first primary school in Azad Kashmir was opened there and was heavily influenced by Persian (the official state language during the Mughal reign). Panjeri was later split into dhoks (sub-villages) under the council of Panjeri. One dhok was named after Peer Taj Ud Din. As its spiritual founder, many generations regard him highly.

Each tribe or group of the Chib Rajput was named after a Panjeri personality. For example: Pati Jatu khan from Raja Gujarkhan, Pati Bhaiki from Raja Bhai Khan, Pati Reiki from Raja Sahib Khan and Pati Sultani from Raja Sultan Khan. Sardar Raja Rahim Dad Khan is Zaildar of Panjari.

Army

Panjeri has produced many soldiers and high-ranking officials in the Pakistan army, including 4 Lieutenants General, 2 Major General and 14 Lieutenant Colonels. Panjeri is known as “the land of war heroes” or “the birthplace of soldiers”, for its long history of providing military leaders such as Raja Habib ur Rahman (World War 2 and 1947 Kashmir war). Gen Abdul Rahman served as Prime Minister of Alwar State and First High Commissioner of Pakistan to lndia after Pakistani independence. Ghulam Rasul Raja was one of the first Lieutenant Colonels of the Pakistan Army and was awarded Sitara e Jurat (the third highest civilian award) for his bravery and sacrifices.

Some100 serving commissioned officers hail from Panjeri. Major General Raja Kashif Azad was promoted in 2019 and along with Lieutenant General of Kashmir Regiment Raja Sher Afgun is one of the Army's most senior officers. Major Raja Asif Azad (younger brother of Major General Raja Kashif Azad) was promoted in 2019.

Sub-villages
The Union Council of Panjeri is spread over 39 sub-villages. I tis the most important union council of Bhimber District. Many of the surrounding dhoks of Panjeri have historical links to Panjeri.

Major sub-villages are:

Chani Kanjal  
Chani Raike 
Sairi 
Kalyal 
Maryal 
Chani Malkani 
Ghazi Ghurah 
Kahmbi 
Parli Channi 
Dhok Panjeri (Largest)

People
The village is inhabited predominately by Rajputs. The main professions are military service and local politics. Since the 1990s, increasing numbers have emigrated to the United Kingdom. Five people from Panjeri were awarded a military cross due to their service in World Wars.

Notable people 
 Raja Habib ur Rahman Khan 
 Ghulam Rasul Raja
 DIG Raja Irfan Saleem
 Lieutenant General Raja Sher Afgan

Politics
Panjeri plays a role in district politics. Bhimber and Mirpur district politicians hail from the village. Capt Fazal ur Rahman late was member of Kasmir Assembly in 1947 and after partition became Minister in AJK Govt .Raja Imitiaz of PPP and Raja Azhar Iqbal of PMLN, is from Panjeri. Former member of parliament and advisor Raja Fida Hussain Kiani plays a role in the union council of Panjeri. Hailing from Panjeri is SSP of Mirpur Police Raja Irfan Saleem.

Education
The village is served by Government girls degree college for women, Government higher secondary school for Boys and Government high school for girls. Panjeri had the first primary school in Azad Kashmir. The people of Panjeri built modern educational facilities. People from nearby villages used to come to study in Panjeri, as it was the central hub of education in the 20th century.

References

Bhimber District